Zangbeto are the traditional voodoo guardians of the night among the Ogu (or Egun) people of Benin, Togo and Nigeria. A traditional police and security institution, the Zangbeto cult is charged with the maintenance of law and order, and ensures safety and security within Ogu communities. They are highly revered and act as an unofficial police force patrolling the streets, especially in the night, watching over people and their properties, and tracking down criminals and presenting them to the community to punish. Originally created to scare the enemy away, Zangbeto will wander the streets to detect thieves and witches, and to protect law and order.

Description
Relating its fundamental cultural role in local vigilantism and community policing in Ogu societies, Zangbeto is a term in Gun language which means "Men of the night" or "Night-watchmen".

The Zangbeto takes on a covering made from an intricate mass of tiny strands of hay, raffia or other threadlike materials, which are sometimes dyed in very colourful hues. They are able to fall into a trance which, according to tradition, enables their bodies to be inhabited by spirits who possess special knowledge of the actions of people. However, Ogu legend tells that there are no humans under the costume, only spirits of the night.

In Ogu culture, the Zangbetos are the traditional security guards or policemen of their communities. They are said to form a secret society which can only be strictly attended by Zangbeto or voodoo worshipers and devotees. Zangbeto is deemed to have spiritistic and magical abilities, such as swallowing splinters of glass without coming to any harm and scaring away even witches. In a trance, the Zangbeto are said to evoke a power that inhabited the earth long before the appearance of man and provide a source of wisdom and continuity for the Ogu people.

Elaborate festivals built around the Zangbeto are held regularly in different Ogu communities across West Africa. The popular ones are those that hold in Porto-Novo, Benin Republic and in Ajido, Lagos, Nigeria. These festivals comprise colourful displays, electrifying performances, and magic.

Notes

Citations

Works cited

External links
 Video of A Zangbeto on YouTube

Articles containing video clips
Beninese culture
Togolese culture
West African Vodun
Historical law enforcement occupations